Michel Canac (2 August 1956 – 30 May 2019) was a French alpine skier who competed in the 1984 Winter Olympics.

References

External links
 sports-reference.com

1956 births
2019 deaths
French male alpine skiers
Olympic alpine skiers of France
Alpine skiers at the 1984 Winter Olympics